Volakas may refer to:

Volakas, Drama, a village in the municipality Kato Nevrokopi, Drama regional unit, Greece
Volakas, Elis, a municipality in Elis, Greece
Volakas, Tinos, a village on the island of Tinos in the Cyclades, Greece